Good Mourning is a 2022 American stoner comedy film written, produced and directed by and starring Machine Gun Kelly (credited as Colson Baker) and Mod Sun. It also stars Zach Villa, GaTa, Becky G, Dove Cameron and Megan Fox.

The film follows a movie star London Clash's world turned upside down when he wakes up to an implied break up text from the love of his life. And the timing couldn't be worse because the most important meeting of his career is scheduled for later that same day. Compounded by chaotic roommates, and wildly unpredictable twists and turns, London's day keeps going downhill until ultimately, he is forced to choose between pursuing his one true love and landing a life-changing, starring role in a major motion picture.

Good Mourning was theatrically released on May 20, 2022, through Open Road Films. The film received mainly negative reviews from critics, and was nominated for 43rd Golden Raspberry Awards, including Worst Actor for Baker.

Plot
Actor London Clash wakes up to text messages from his girlfriend, Apple, including an apology and the phrase ‘good mourning.’ He is unable to reach her, and worries that the messages are a breakup. Compounding his stress are the arrival of his new assistant, Olive, and a role in a new Batman film that he is waiting to hear about. He manages to make contact with Apple, but their conversation is interrupted when Trippie Redd hits him with a water balloon, breaking his phone. London, along with friends Angel and Leo, break into Apple’s house looking for her, only to shatter urns containing her cremated relatives. Angel proposes using cannabis ash to replace the remains, and the three embark on a heavy smoking session with the help of their friends Dylan, Fat Joe and Kennedy. 

Olive provides London with a new phone, which he uses to get in touch with Apple. However, when his friends return to Apple’s house to replace the urns, they see her leaving the house with another man. London skips a meeting with the director of the Batman movie to meet Apple at a Van Nuys airport. He is knocked out by the unknown man, which is filmed by Dennis Rodman, but is rescued and treated by his stalker, Sabrina. Meanwhile, Leo attends the meeting in London’s place, wearing a mask to conceal his identity. In the middle of the meeting, he and Dylan are arrested after being spotted leaving Apple’s house.

London makes it home to find Apple waiting, who reveals that the mysterious man was her stylist, and the ‘good mourning’ text was simply a typo. Furious at London for his behavior, she breaks up with him, and Maxine fires him as a client. After bailing Dylan and Leo out of jail, the group heads to a party Apple is attending YG’s house, but are unable to get in. After getting Fat Joe out of a k-hole, they travel to a late night diner. Olive arrives with Maxine on the phone, who tells London that the viral video of him getting punched in the face has landed him the Batman role. He calls Apple, who agrees to meet him at the site of their first kiss. However, while texting and driving, he crashes into Apple, landing the two of them in the same hospital room together.

A post-credits scene appears to indicate that the events of the film were in fact an episode of a television show, with London Clash (played by a British actor) a character.

Cast
 Machine Gun Kelly as London Clash
 Mod Sun as Dylan
 Becky G as Apple
 Dove Cameron as Olive
 GaTa as Leo
 Zach Villa as Angel
 Jenna Boyd as Sabrina the Stalker
 Boo Johnson as Fat Joe
 Amber Rose as Weed Girl
 Avril Lavigne as Avril Lavigne
 Dennis Rodman as Basketball Cameo
 Rickey Thompson as Workout Demon
 Tom Arnold as Famous Director
 Whitney Cummings as Maxine
 Megan Fox as Kennedy
 Pete Davidson as Berry
 Adin Ross as Airport Worker
 Danny Trejo as Method Cameo
 YG as Party Cameo
 Trippie Redd as Pool Guest
 Brittany Furlan as Waitress
 Snoop Dogg as The Joint

Reception

Critical response
On review aggregator Rotten Tomatoes, the film holds a 0% rating based on reviews from 7 critics.

Jeffrey Anderson of Common Sense Media gave it 2 out of 5 and wrote: "without help from outside substances, this showbiz/stoner comedy doesn't really offer anything we haven't seen before and never achieves more than a mild chuckle."

Box office
In the United States and Canada, the film earned $16,010 from 28 theaters in its opening weekend. In total the film has grossed $21,348.

Accolades
At the 43rd Golden Raspberry Awards, the film received seven nominations: Worst Picture, Worst Director, Worst Actor (for Kelly), Worst Supporting Actor (for Sun and for Davidson), Worst Screenplay and Worst Screen Combo (for Kelly and Sun), winning Worst Director.

References

External links
 

2022 films
2022 romantic comedy films
2020s English-language films
American films about cannabis
American romantic comedy films
Films about smoking
Open Road Films films
Stoner films
2022 directorial debut films
2020s American films